Ernest Boulanger may refer to:

Ernest Boulanger (politician) (1831–1907), French politician
Ernest Boulanger (composer) (1815–1900), French composer

See also
Georges Ernest Boulanger (1837–1891), French general and politician